Garfield is a city in Bergen County in the U.S. state of New Jersey. As of the 2020 United States census, the city's population was 32,655, an increase of 2,168 (+7.1%) from the 2010 census count of 30,487, which in turn reflected an increase of 701 (+2.4%) from the 29,786 counted in the 2000 census.

History

When the area that is now Garfield was first developed in 1873 with an initial group of seven homes constructed by Gilbert D. Bogart, it was known as East Passaic. 

In 1881, the community's name was changed to Garfield in honor of President of the United States James Garfield. There are two explanations given for the circumstances behind the renaming. According to one, shortly after Garfield was elected to the presidency the founder of East Passaic said, "tell everyone...don't speak of East Passaic anymore; call it 'Garfield' after the man who will lead this great country to prosperity." Seven months later, President Garfield was assassinated but his name remained with the community. The second theory holds that after Garfield's death in 1881, a new train station was named in his honor, which in turn led to the surrounding area becoming associated with his name as well.

Garfield was originally incorporated as a borough on March 15, 1898, from portions of Saddle River Township and Wallington. At the time, the New Jersey Legislature set Garfield's boundaries as they exist today. On April 19, 1917, the borough became the City of Garfield, based on the results of a referendum held two days earlier.

Geography
According to the United States Census Bureau, the city had a total area of 2.19 square miles (5.67 km2), including 2.11 square miles (5.47 km2) of land and 0.08 square miles (0.21 km2) of water (3.65%).

Unincorporated communities, localities and place names located partially or completely within the township include Belmont, Bogart Heights, Dundee Dam and Plauderville.

The city has land borders with adjacent Elmwood Park, Lodi, Saddle Brook and South Hackensack. The Saddle River is a shared border with Wallington.  There are three bridges over the Passaic River crossing the municipal and county line to Passaic and Clifton in Passaic County.

Environment
The United States Environmental Protection Agency has identified Garfield as the site of groundwater contaminated hexavalent chromium from a spill in 1983 at the E.C. Electroplating Corporation site.

Demographics

Based on data from the 2011–2015 American Community Survey, the city had a median age of 35.4, the lowest median age in the county. Garfield was one of four municipalities with a median age below the national and state average of 37.6, and well below the median age of 41.5 in Bergen County.

The borough is also home to the architecturally prominent Russian Orthodox Church of Three Saints, which serves the growing Ukrainian American community in western Bergen County.

2010 census

The Census Bureau's 2006–2010 American Community Survey showed that (in 2010 inflation-adjusted dollars) median household income was $51,407 (with a margin of error of +/− $1,842) and the median family income was $56,701 (+/− $5,020). Males had a median income of $42,927 (+/− $1,953) versus $33,231 (+/− $3,471) for females. The per capita income for the city was $24,022 (+/− $1,348). About 9.8% of families and 13.0% of the population were below the poverty line, including 23.0% of those under age 18 and 16.2% of ages 65 years or over.

Same-sex couples headed 68 households in 2010.

2000 census
As of the 2000 United States census there were 29,786 people, 11,250 households, and 7,425 families residing in the city. The population density was 13,976.0 people per square mile (5,399.3/km2). There were 11,698 housing units at an average density of 5,488.8 per square mile (2,120.5/km2). The racial makeup of the city was 82.11% White, 2.98% African American, 0.33% Native American, 2.69% Asian, 0.01% Pacific Islander, 8.10% from other races, and 3.79% from two or more races. Hispanic or Latino of any race were 20.11% of the population.

There were 11,250 households, out of which 30.5% had children under the age of 18 living with them, 46.5% were married couples living together, 13.8% had a female householder with no husband present, and 34.0% were non-families. 27.4% of all households were made up of individuals, and 12.2% had someone living alone who was 65 years of age or older. The average household size was 2.64 and the average family size was 3.26.

In the city the age distribution of the population shows 22.4% under the age of 18, 9.6% from 18 to 24, 33.2% from 25 to 44, 20.8% from 45 to 64, and 14.1% who were 65 years of age or older. The median age was 36 years. For every 100 females, there were 95.0 males. For every 100 females age 18 and over, there were 92.0 males.

The median income for a household in the city was $42,748, and the median income for a family was $51,654. Males had a median income of $35,987 versus $26,896 for females. The per capita income for the city was $19,530. About 6.4% of families and 7.8% of the population were below the poverty line, including 9.1% of those under age 18 and 8.1% of those age 65 or over.

As of the 2000 Census, an adjusted 22.9% of Garfield's population reported Polish ancestry, ranked third highest in New Jersey behind Manville (23.1%) and Wallington (45.5%).

Government

Local government
The City of Garfield operates under the 1923 Municipal Manager Law of New Jersey municipal government, with a governing body comprised of a five-member Council, who appoint a City Manager. Council members are elected at-large in non-partisan elections to serve four-year terms on a concurrent basis. The city is one of seven municipalities (of the 564) statewide that use this form of government. In November 2015, following a referendum that supported the move by a 3-1 margin, the City Council voted to shift the city's municipal elections from May to November, citing hopes for greater voter participation and potential savings of $50,000 for each election; the shift result in the extension of terms for the then-serving council and municipal manager by six months, to the end of December 2016. The most recent municipal election was held on November 8, 2016, together with the presidential election.

At a reorganization meeting held after each election, the Council selects one of its members to be the Mayor and another to serve as Deputy Mayor. The day-to-day operation of the city is carried out under the supervision of the appointed department heads, who report to the City Manager.

, members of the Garfield City Council are Mayor Richard Rigoglioso, Deputy Mayor Joseph Delaney, Alejandina Banch, Romi Herrera and Pawel Maslag, all serving concurrent terms of office that end December 31, 2024.

In July 2021, the city council appointed Alejandrina Banch to fill the council seat that had been held by Erin Nora Delaney until she stepped down to take office as the city manager / clerk, succeeding Thomas Duch, who had been appointed as the administrator of Bergen County. Banch served on an interim basis until the November 2021 general election, when she was elected to serve the balance of the term of office.

Federal, state and county representation
Garfield is located in the 9th Congressional District and is part of New Jersey's 35th state legislative district. Prior to the 2011 reapportionment following the 2010 Census, Garfield had been in the 36th state legislative district.

Politics

As of March 2011, there were a total of 11,904 registered voters in Garfield, of which 3,958 (33.2% vs. 31.7% countywide) were registered as Democrats, 1,395 (11.7% vs. 21.1%) were registered as Republicans and 6,541 (54.9% vs. 47.1%) were registered as Unaffiliated. There were 10 voters registered as Libertarians or Greens. Among the city's 2010 Census population, 39.0% (vs. 57.1% in Bergen County) were registered to vote, including 50.9% of those ages 18 and over (vs. 73.7% countywide).

In the 2016 presidential election, Democrat Hillary Clinton received 5,477 votes (57.3% vs. 54.2% countywide), ahead of Republican Donald Trump with 3,782 votes (39.6% vs. 41.1%) and other candidates with 299 votes (3.1% vs. 4.6%), among the 9,690 ballots cast by the city's 14,816 registered voters, for a turnout of 65.4% (vs. 72.5% in Bergen County). In the 2012 presidential election, Democrat Barack Obama received 5,538 votes (67.1% vs. 54.8% countywide), ahead of Republican Mitt Romney with 2,540 votes (30.8% vs. 43.5%) and other candidates with 96 votes (1.2% vs. 0.9%), among the 8,256 ballots cast by the city's 13,183 registered voters, for a turnout of 62.6% (vs. 70.4% in Bergen County). In the 2008 presidential election, Democrat Barack Obama received 5,138 votes (59.7% vs. 53.9% countywide), ahead of Republican John McCain with 3,315 votes (38.5% vs. 44.5%) and other candidates with 68 votes (0.8% vs. 0.8%), among the 8,613 ballots cast by the city's 13,013 registered voters, for a turnout of 66.2% (vs. 76.8% in Bergen County). In the 2004 presidential election, Democrat John Kerry received 4,804 votes (57.8% vs. 51.7% countywide), ahead of Republican George W. Bush with 3,394 votes (40.9% vs. 47.2%) and other candidates with 66 votes (0.8% vs. 0.7%), among the 8,305 ballots cast by the city's 12,665 registered voters, for a turnout of 65.6% (vs. 76.9% in the whole county).

In the 2013 gubernatorial election, Republican Chris Christie received 50.4% of the vote (1,960 cast), ahead of Democrat Barbara Buono with 48.0% (1,865 votes), and other candidates with 1.6% (63 votes), among the 3,960 ballots cast by the city's 12,609 registered voters (72 ballots were spoiled), for a turnout of 31.4%. In the 2009 gubernatorial election, Democrat Jon Corzine received 2,428 ballots cast (54.1% vs. 48.0% countywide), ahead of Republican Chris Christie with 1,796 votes (40.0% vs. 45.8%), Independent Chris Daggett with 203 votes (4.5% vs. 4.7%) and other candidates with 27 votes (0.6% vs. 0.5%), among the 4,490 ballots cast by the city's 12,282 registered voters, yielding a 36.6% turnout (vs. 50.0% in the county).

Education
The Garfield Public Schools serve students in pre-kindergarten through twelfth grade. The district is one of 31 former Abbott districts statewide that were established pursuant to the decision by the New Jersey Supreme Court in Abbott v. Burke which are now referred to as "SDA Districts" based on the requirement for the state to cover all costs for school building and renovation projects in these districts under the supervision of the New Jersey Schools Development Authority.

As of the 2020–21 school year, the district, comprised of 12 schools, had an enrollment of 4,713 students and 438.1 classroom teachers (on an FTE basis), for a student–teacher ratio of 10.8:1. Schools in the district (with 2020–21 enrollment data from the National Center for Education Statistics) are 
Garfield Early Childhood Learning Center (178 students; in Pre-K), 
Garfield Public Preschool Annex (95; Pre-K), 
Garfield Public Preschool Annex 3 (159; Pre-K), 
Washington Irving School #4 (382; K–5), 
Woodrow Wilson School #5 (280; K–5), 
Abraham Lincoln Elementary School #6 (365; Pre-K–5), 
Theodore Roosevelt School #7 (273; K–5), 
Christopher Columbus School #8 (306; K–5), 
Thomas Jefferson School #9 (295; K–5), 
James Madison School #10 (245; K–5), 
Garfield Middle School (989; 6–8) and 
Garfield High School (1,159; 9–12).

Public school students from the city, and all of Bergen County, are eligible to attend the secondary education programs offered by the Bergen County Technical Schools, which include the Bergen County Academies in Hackensack, and the Bergen Tech campus in Teterboro or Paramus. The district offers programs on a shared-time or full-time basis, with admission based on a selective application process and tuition covered by the student's home school district.

Bergen Arts and Science Charter School, which opened in September 2006, serves public school students in the district, as well as those from Hackensack and Lodi. The elementary (grades K–3) and middle (4–8) school facilities are located in Garfield, while the high school (9–12) is in Hackensack. As of the 2018–2019  school year, the charter school had an enrollment of  1,163 students and 83.0 classroom teachers (on an FTE basis), for a student–teacher ratio of 14.0:1.

Emergency services

Police
The Garfield Police Department (GPD) provides emergency and protective services to the city of Garfield. The GPD consists of 61 sworn officers.

Fire
The Garfield Fire Department (GFD) is a fully volunteer fire department. The GFD was organized on July 17, 1893. The department is staffed by 150 fully trained firefighters operating out of five firehouses. The department has three engine companies, one rescue engine company and one ladder(tiller) company. In addition they have a hazardous materials unit, a water rescue boat and a foam tender.

Transportation

Roads and highways

U.S. Route 46 and County Route 507 pass through Garfield. Other main roads include Midland Avenue, Outwater Lane, River Drive and Passaic Street. There are five crossings of the Lower Passaic River.

Public transportation
Both the Garfield station and the Plauderville station, located on the Saddle Brook border, are served by NJ Transit's Bergen County Line, providing service to Hoboken Terminal, with transfers available at Secaucus Junction to Penn Station in Midtown Manhattan and to most of NJ Transit's other train lines.

NJ Transit buses serving Garfield include routes 160 and 161 serving the Port Authority Bus Terminal in Midtown Manhattan, and local service on routes 702, 707, 709 and 758.

Notable people

People who were born in, residents of, or otherwise closely associated with Garfield include:

 Tony Aless (1921–1988), jazz pianist
 Miles Austin (born 1984), wide receiver for the Dallas Cowboys
 Joe Benigno (born 1953), sports radio personality on WFAN
 Joan Berger (1933–2021), infielder and outfielder who played for the Rockford Peaches in the All-American Girls Professional Baseball League
 Al Blozis (1919–1945), player for the New York Giants killed during World War II
 Linda Bove (born 1945), deaf actress who played the part of Linda the Librarian on the children's television program Sesame Street from 1971 to 2003
 David Brigati (born 1940), original member of Joey Dee and the Starliters and backing singer for The Rascals
 Eddie Brigati (born 1945), singer/songwriter, founding member of The Rascals
 Luis Castillo (born 1983), defensive end for the San Diego Chargers
 Wayne Chrebet (born 1973), wide receiver who played for the New York Jets
 Mickey Deans (1934–2003), musician,  fifth husband of Judy Garland
 Thomas J. Duch (born 1956), former mayor of Garfield who served in the New Jersey General Assembly and was appointed as Bergen County administrator
 Gordon Hollingshead (1892–1952), movie producer who won six Academy Awards, including for the 1945 short film Star in the Night
 Otto Huber (1914–1989), Major League Baseball player who played for the Boston Bees during the 1939 season
 Gianfranco Iannotta (born 1994), track and field athlete who won a gold medal at the 2016 Summer Paralympics
 Dennis Joel (born 1947), former child actor and singer
 Isaac M. Laddon (1894–1976), aircraft designer
 Tippy Larkin (1911–1992), boxer
 Michael J. Pollard (1939–2019), character actor and comedian widely known for his role as C.W. Moss in the film Bonnie and Clyde (1967), for which he received an Academy Award for Best Supporting Actor nomination
 Gorgi Popstefanov (born 1987), Macedonian road racing cyclist
 Janice Robinson (born 1967), singer, solo and with Livin' Joy
 Paul L. Troast (1894–1972), building contractor, chairman of the New Jersey Turnpike Authority during its construction, and one-time failed gubernatorial candidate in 1953
 Joseph Villa (1948–1995), pianist
 Richard F. Visotcky (1929–2002), politician who served as mayor of Garfield for six terms was a member of the New Jersey General Assembly

Sources

 Municipal Incorporations of the State of New Jersey (according to Counties) prepared by the Division of Local Government, Department of the Treasury (New Jersey); December 1, 1958.
 Clayton, W. Woodford; and Nelson, Nelson. History of Bergen and Passaic Counties, New Jersey, with Biographical Sketches of Many of its Pioneers and Prominent Men. Philadelphia: Everts and Peck, 1882.
 Harvey, Cornelius Burnham (ed.), Genealogical History of Hudson and Bergen Counties, New Jersey. New York: New Jersey Genealogical Publishing Co., 1900.
 Van Valen, James M. History of Bergen County, New Jersey. New York: New Jersey Publishing and Engraving Co., 1900.
 Westervelt, Frances A. (Frances Augusta), 1858–1942, History of Bergen County, New Jersey, 1630–1923, Lewis Historical Publishing Company, 1923.

References

External links

 City of Garfield official website
 Garfield Chamber of Commerce
 Year 1909 bird's eye view

 
1873 establishments in New Jersey
1923 Municipal Manager Law
Cities in Bergen County, New Jersey
Populated places established in 1873